The Darumbal people, also spelt Dharumbal, are the Aboriginal Australians that have traditionally occupied Central Queensland, speaking dialects of the Darumbal language. Darumbal people of the Keppel Islands and surrounding regions are sometimes also known as Woppaburra or Ganumi, and the terms are sometimes used interchangeably.

Country

Traditional Darumbal land is considered to encompass an estimated  around most of coastal Central Queensland, running from Arthur Point at Shoalwater Bay to Yeppoon, and taking in the mouth of Fitzroy River and Keppel Islands. From Keppel Bay they extended inland to Boomer Range, and Marlborough, Yaamba, Rockhampton, and Gracemere.

History
With the arrival of European settlers in the region, some Darumbal people were tolerated as part of fringe communities of the new settlements, but most were systematically killed to make way for pastoral development.
According to some estimates, "between 1865 and 1902 the population of the Keppel Islands suffered a substantial reduction of 75 to 80 per cent". In one incident alone on July 1865 alone, native troopers ambushed a Darumbal ceremonial gathering outside Rockhampton, near Samuel Birkbeck's Glenmore Station and shot dead 18 Aboriginal people, after nearby settlers expressed worries about the presence of natives in their area. After the massacre, they then set fire to the corpses.

Language

Ethnologue classifies the Darumbal language as "extinct". Technically, Bayali was quite distinct from Darumbal, sharing, according to Dixon's analysis, no more than 21% of its basic word stock with Darumbal.

Gudamulli is a Darumbal greeting, meaning 'hello'.

Some Darumbal words live on in place names in Central Queensland. The town of Coowonga is named after a Darumbal man famous for saving the life of politician King O'Malley in the late 19th century. The Rockhampton suburb of Nerimbera is named for a Darumbal word meaning 'where the mountains meet the river'.

Society
According to ethnologist Norman Tindale, the Darumbal comprised some 13 groups or band societies, though one of these was described as belonging to the Ningebal people. One extinct branch of the group, the Warabal, may have dwelt around the foot of the Boomer Range.

Native title
Darumbal native title claims and land use issues were lodged in the 21st century. In 2001, a claim was made to the National Native Title Tribunal,  and in 2007,  at Mount Wheeler were handed over to the Darumbal people. Darumbal people have been granted limited access to the Shoalwater Bay Military Training Area.

There have been several controversies regarding fisheries licensing and conservation.

The occasion was marked by a ceremony on the beach at Emu Park.

Notes

Citations

Sources

External links
 Bibliography of Darumbal people and language resources, at the Australian Institute of Aboriginal and Torres Strait Islander Studies

Aboriginal communities in Queensland